The Robinson–Schwenn Building is a historic building in Hamilton, Ohio. It was originally erected in 1866 as the Dixon Opera House and was later renamed to the Globe Opera House. The building was listed in the National Register of Historic Places on July 14, 2000. It was renovated in 2012–2013 and is currently used by Miami University as an arts and community center.

Notes 

Opera houses on the National Register of Historic Places in Ohio
Buildings and structures in Hamilton, Ohio
Music venues completed in 1866
National Register of Historic Places in Butler County, Ohio
1866 establishments in Ohio